The Ice House may refer to:

 The Ice House (novel), a 1992 novel by Minette Walters
 The Ice House (comedy club), a California comedy club
 The Ice House (1978 film), a BBC drama featured as A Ghost Story for Christmas
 The Ice House (1969 film), an American trash/horror/thriller film
 The Ice House (St. Petersburg), an Ice House built in January 1740 in Russia.

See also
 Icehouse (disambiguation)